Park Ki-ju (born 14 February 1990, Seoul) is a South Korean field hockey player. At the 2012 and 2016 Summer Olympics she competed with the Korea women's national field hockey team in the women's tournament.

As a member of the South Korean team, she won a silver medal at the 2010 Asian Games and a gold medal at 2014 Asian Games.

References

External links
 

1990 births
Living people
South Korean female field hockey players
Asian Games medalists in field hockey
Asian Games gold medalists for South Korea
Asian Games silver medalists for South Korea
Field hockey players at the 2010 Asian Games
Field hockey players at the 2012 Summer Olympics
Field hockey players at the 2014 Asian Games
Field hockey players at the 2016 Summer Olympics
Korea National Sport University alumni
Medalists at the 2010 Asian Games
Medalists at the 2014 Asian Games
Olympic field hockey players of South Korea
Universiade medalists in field hockey
People from Seoul
Universiade gold medalists for South Korea
Medalists at the 2013 Summer Universiade
20th-century South Korean women
21st-century South Korean women